Stompneus Bay is a village east of Shell Bay Point, 7 km north-west of St Helena Bay and 20 km north of Vredenburg. Named after a type of fish, Chrysophrys globiceps. The form Stompneusbaai is preferred for official purposes.

References

Populated places in the Saldanha Bay Local Municipality